Rheochloa is a monotypic genus of flowering plants belonging to the family Poaceae. The only species is Rheochloa scabriflora.

Its native range is Brazil.

References

Poaceae
Monotypic Poaceae genera